Etna Township is a township in Hardin County, Iowa, USA.

History
Etna Township was first settled in 1853.

References

Townships in Hardin County, Iowa
Townships in Iowa
1853 establishments in Iowa